Emilio Prados (4 March 1899 - 24 April 1962) was a Spanish poet and editor, a member of the Generation of '27.

Life
Born in the Andalusian city of Málaga in 1899, Prados was offered a place at Madrid's famous Residencia de estudiantes in 1914 and moved into its university section in 1918. Here he met Lorca, Dalí, Buñuel and many other young people who were to become celebrated and influential figures in Spanish art and literature.

In 1921 a long-running lung complaint forced him to retire to a sanatorium in Davosplatz, Switzerland, where he spent most of the year. In this enforced seclusion from wider society he read widely in European literature and settled upon becoming a writer himself. Emerging from the sanatorium in 1922, he resumed his academic training: taking courses at the universities of Freiburg and Berlin; visiting museums and art galleries across Germany; immersing himself in the artistic culture of Paris and meeting, amongst others, Pablo Picasso.

In the summer of 1924 he returned to Málaga, where he continued writing. Together with Manuel Altolaguirre he founded the magazine Litoral, one of the most influential literary and artistic publications of 1920s Spain. In 1925 he became an Editor for the Sur printing-house, again working closely with Altolaguirre. Sur was responsible for publishing most of the work of the Generation of '27, and the quality of their editing brought Prados and Altolaguirre international prestige.

At the same time as he was working in literature and pursuing his own creative talents, Prados took an increasing interest in social affairs and politics, particularly the marginalisation of the poorest sectors of society. The climate of violence in Málaga after the outbreak of the Spanish Civil War in 1936 led him to return to Madrid, where he joined the Alianza de Intelectuales Antifascistas and began contributing enthusiastically to the intellectual side of the Republican cause. As well as publishing his own works (his compilation of war poetry, Destino fiel, won the National Literature Prize in 1938), he edited various books including Homenaje al poeta Federico García Lorca and Romancero general de la guerra de España.

He moved to Barcelona in 1938 and took charge, again with Altolaguirre, of the publications of the Republican Ministry of Public Instruction. However, as a prominent Republican he was soon forced to flee Spain altogether as the Nationalists won victory in the Civil War. He escaped to Paris and then, early in July 1939, in the company of a variety of other intellectual Republican figures, to Mexico, where he lived until his death in 1962.

Work
Early work, 1925 - 1928: Prados's poetry highlights in particular the relationship between the natural world and the otherness of being, mixing avant-garde and surrealist elements with his own Arabic/Andalusian roots.
Tiempo 
Veinte poemas en verso
Seis estampas paraun rompecabezas
Canciones del farero 
Vuelta 
El misterio del agua

Political poetry, 1932 - 1938: Prados devotes himself to outspokenly social and political poetry, developing these themes using surrealist language.
La voz cautiva 
Andando, andando por el mundo 
La tierra que no alienta
Seis estancias
Llanto en la sangre
El llanto subterráneo
Tres cantos
Homenaje al poeta Federico García Lorca contra su muerte
Romances
Romancero general de la guerra de España
Cancionero menor para los combatientes
Destino fiel (a collection of all his war poetry, won the Premio Nacional de Literatura in 1938)

Poetry from exile, 1939 - 1962: Prados's later poetry carries a profound sense of rootlessness and solitude. Thematically his work becomes much denser and more philosophical, addressing the complexity of concepts such as new life, solidarity and love.

Mínima muerte 
Jardín cerrado 
Memoria del olvido
Penumbras
Río natural 
Circuncisión del sueño
Signos del ser

1899 births
1962 deaths
People from Málaga
Generation of '27
Spanish male poets
Writers from Andalusia
Spanish people of the Spanish Civil War (Republican faction)
Exiles of the Spanish Civil War in Mexico
20th-century Spanish poets
20th-century Spanish male writers
Spanish editors
LGBT history in Spain